The Silver Theatre is a television series that was broadcast on the CBS television network from 1949 to 1950.  Hosted by Conrad Nagel, it was a live anthology series consisting of dramatic teleplays about romance. It was sponsored by the International Silver Company. Per an episode on the Internet Archive, the series ran 25 minutes excluding commercials. There were a total of 39 episodes. 

It was nominated for one Primetime Emmy Award in 1949 in the category Best Film Made for and Viewed on Television or episode The Guiding Star. 

Frank Telford was the program's producer.  Among its guest stars were Hugh Beaumont, Ward Bond, Ann Dvorak, William Frawley, Eva Gabor, Margaret Hamilton, Marsha Hunt (actress), Kim Hunter, Paul Lukas, Diana Lynn, Burgess Meredith, John Payne, George Reeves, and Gig Young.

Seventeen filmed episodes of the program were leased and rerun as episodes of The Bigelow Theatre.

References

External links
The Silver Theatre at CVTA with episode list
The Silver Theatre at the Internet Movie Database
Public domain episode of The Silver Theatre at Internet Archive, under title Hollywood Half-Hour

1949 American television series debuts
1950 American television series endings
1940s American romance television series
1950s American romance television series
CBS original programming
1940s American anthology television series
1950s American anthology television series
Black-and-white American television shows
American live television series
English-language television shows